Parc écologique des Sansonnets or Parc Sansonnets (English: Ecological Park of the Starlings) is a forested natural reserve located in Brossard, Quebec. Numerous footpaths start from these major streets to provide access to the inner parts of this park.

This park was officially recognized by the city of Brossard as a natural reserve on September 14, 1981.  It was named after a species of bird that is common to this area: l'étourneau sansonnet (common starling or Sturnus vulgaris).

The dominant tree in this forest is the northern red oak. Red maple is also abundant. Two species uncommon in Quebec are present: shagbark hickory in the tree canopy and mayapple in the understory. Poison ivy also occurs in the understory, along with various species of moss and mushroom. The soil is an imperfectly drained loamy sand podzol, mapped as Saint-Damase series.

References
Forest Anonymous
Dictionnaire historique de Brossard

Sansonnets Park
Protected areas of Montérégie